Michael Pratt (born September 30, 2001) is an American football quarterback who currently plays for the Tulane Green Wave.

Early life and high school
Pratt grew up in Boca Raton, Florida and was home schooled until the ninth grade. He initially attended Boca Raton High School, where he joined the football team as a freshman after never having played the sport before. As a junior, Pratt passed  for 1,208 yards and 12 touchdowns with nine interceptions while also rushing for 447 yards and three touchdowns. He transferred to Deerfield Beach High School prior to his senior year. Pratt was rated a three-star recruit and committed to play college football at Tulane.

College career
Pratt became the starting quarterback for the Tulane Green Wave three games into his freshman season. He finished the year with 1,806 passing yards and 20 touchdown passes and also rushed for 229 yards and eight touchdowns. As a sophomore, Pratt completed 57.6% of his passes for 2,381 yards and 21 touchdowns with eight interceptions. He entered his junior season on the watchlist for the Maxwell Award.

Statistics

References

External links
Tulane Green Wave profile

Living people
Players of American football from Florida
American football quarterbacks
Tulane Green Wave football players
Sportspeople from Boca Raton, Florida
Boca Raton Community High School alumni
Year of birth missing (living people)